Leutnant Wilhelm Fahlbusch (8 February 1892 – 6 September 1916) was an early World War I flying ace credited with five aerial victories, shared with his observer Hans Rosencrantz.

Career

Wilhelm Fahlbusch was born in Hanover on 8 February 1892. Little is known of this pioneering ace's career. "Willi" Fahlbusch was that rarity in the Luftstreitkräfte, a reconnaissance pilot who became an ace. He flew as a member of Kasta 1, teamed with Hans Rosencrantz in a Roland Whale. They were credited with five aerial victories during 1916, with the last being scored on 31 August 1916 over a British Martinsyde Elephant two-seater craft. Fahlbusch was awarded the Iron Cross for his valor.

On 6 September 1916, Fahlbusch and Rosencrantz clashed with Sopwith 1 1/2 Strutters from No. 70 Squadron Royal Flying Corps. The German duo were shot down in flames over Malincourt, with three British air crews posting victory claims. Credit was granted to both Bernard Beanlands and his observer, and William Sanday and his observer.

References

Further reading
 Franks, Norman; Bailey, Frank W.; Guest, Russell. Above the Lines: The Aces and Fighter Units of the German Air Service, Naval Air Service and Flanders Marine Corps, 1914–1918. Grub Street, 1993. , .

External links
 

1892 births
1916 deaths
Military personnel from Hanover
German World War I flying aces
Recipients of the Iron Cross (1914), 1st class
People from the Province of Hanover
Prussian Army personnel
Luftstreitkräfte personnel
German military personnel killed in World War I
Aviators killed by being shot down